Four referendums were held in Switzerland during 1951. The first was held on 25 February on a federal resolution on transport, and was rejected by voters. The second was held on 15 April on a popular initiative to ensure purchasing power and full employment, together with a counterproposal. The counterproposal was approved by 69% of voters, whilst the original proposal was rejected by 88% of voters. The fourth referendum was held on 8 July on forcing public enterprises to make a financial contribution to the national defence budget, and was also rejected by voters.

Results

February: Federal resolution on transport

April: Full employment initiative

Proposal

Counter-proposal

July: Defence contributions

References

1951 referendums
1951 in Switzerland
Referendums in Switzerland